"Falling" is a song by American group Haim. The song was released in the United Kingdom on February 12, 2013. It was the third single from their debut studio album, Days Are Gone. The song peaked at number 30 on the UK Singles Chart. A music video of "Falling" was released on YouTube on February 19, 2013. The video was shot in the hills near Pasadena, California. The video's director was Tabitha Denholm, formerly of the band Queens of Noize.

Track listing

Chart performance

Year-end charts

Certifications

References

Haim (band) songs
2013 singles
Polydor Records singles
2013 songs
Song recordings produced by Ariel Rechtshaid
Songs written by Danielle Haim
Songs written by Este Haim
Songs written by Alana Haim